Palermo Shooting is a 2008 film written and directed by German director Wim Wenders, and starring Campino, Dennis Hopper, Giovanna Mezzogiorno, Lou Reed as himself, and an uncredited Milla Jovovich, also playing herself. It was screened at the 2008 Cannes Film Festival.

Plot
A German photographer named Finn (Campino) comes to Palermo because he needs to make a clean break from his past. In the city, he meets a young woman named Flavia (Giovanna Mezzogiorno) and a completely different way of life.

Cast

 Campino as Finn
 Inga Busch as Karla
 Axel Sichrovsky as Hans
 Gerhard Gutberlet as Gerhard
 Harry Blain as Harry
 Sebastian Blomberg as Julian
 Jana Pallaske as Student
 Olivia Asiedu-Poku as Fan
 Melika Foroutan as Anke
 Anna Orso as Mother
 Lou Reed as himself
 Udo Samel as Banker
 Giuseppe Provinzano as Actor 1
 Giuseppe Massa as Actor 2
 Giovanna Mezzogiorno as Flavia
 Patrizia Schiavone as Market woman
 Letizia Battaglia as Photographer
 Alessandro Dieli as Doctor
 Carmelo Billitteri as Doorman
 Dennis Hopper as Frank
 Milla Jovovich as herself
 Anton Giulio Pandolfo as Contained

Production
The film is the first one directed by Wenders in his hometown, Düsseldorf. Filming also took place in the nearby cities of Essen and Neuss as well as Palermo and other areas of Sicily.

Soundtrack
The film's original soundtrack includes songs from Beirut, Jason Collett, Portishead, Calexico, and Iron & Wine. It also features exclusive tracks from Grinderman, Bonnie Prince Billy, Matt Sweeney, and Sibylle Baier.

Release

On 24 May 2008, the film was screened at the 2008 Cannes Film Festival.

The film was released in Germany on 20 November 2008. The film had its U.S. premiere on 20 January 2009 at the Berlin and Beyond film festival at the Castro Theatre in San Francisco.

The closing titles contain a dedication to two directors dead the same day, July 30, 2007, Ingmar Bergman and Michelangelo Antonioni, while filming was underway.

Reception
Peter Brunette of The Hollywood Reporter gave the film an unfavorable review, saying, "Every time the film goes philosophical on us, the resulting dialogue is sententious and banal." Todd McCarthy of Variety said, "Although she can’t save the film from its own silliness, Mezzogiorno does provide a gravity and legitimacy of her own, as her mesmerizing eyes and her excellent delivery in English make a dramatic highlight out of a monologue about a personal tragedy, as well as showing up Campino for the non-actor he is."

At the 2009 Sofia International Film Festival, the film won the Bourgas Municipality prize.

References

External links
 
 

2008 films
German drama films
French drama films
Italian drama films
2000s German-language films
English-language German films
English-language French films
English-language Italian films
2000s Italian-language films
2008 drama films
Films directed by Wim Wenders
Films set in Germany
Films set in Sicily
Films set in Palermo
Films shot in Nordrhein-Westfalen
Films shot in Palermo
2000s French films
2000s German films